is a New Zealand actress, singer and dancer. She landed her first acting role at age 11 as the titular character in the 2004 Nippon TV production of Annie shortly after moving to Japan. Sawai later made her film debut as Kiriko in James McTeigue's 2009 neo-noir martial arts film Ninja Assassin.

Sawai rose to fame in Japan as one of the lead vocalists of the girl group Faky from 2013 to 2018. She made a return to acting with supporting roles in the Japanese mystery series Colors (2018), and the British crime thriller series Giri/Haji (2019). Her international breakthrough came with the role of Naomi in the Apple TV+ drama series Pachinko (2022–present).

Early life
Anna Sawai was born on June 11, 1992 in Wellington, New Zealand to parents of Japanese descent. Her mother trained in opera performance and later worked as a piano teacher, while her father worked for an electronics company. From age 3, her mother taught her how to play the piano and how to sing. Her family moved frequently while growing up due to her father's job, living in Hong Kong and the Philippines, before settling in Yokohama, Japan at age 10. She has an elder sister, Reina, who is a ballet dancer and coryphée at the Hong Kong Ballet company.

Career

Early acting roles and Faky (2004–2018) 
In 2004, Sawai made her acting debut at age 11 in a Tokyo stage production of Annie as the titular character, which was simulcast on Nippon TV. In 2006, Sawai successfully auditioned for the entertainment conglomerate Avex Inc., earning her a management contract and training at their in-house music and dance bootcamp. Following this, Sawai continued her acting career with a minor role in the television drama Our Love Song (2007), and made her Hollywood feature film debut in a supporting role in James McTeigue's neo-noir martial arts film Ninja Assassin (2009), in which she played Kiriko, a rebellious young ninja.

Sawai continued to receive vocal and dancing lessons throughout high school, and later enrolled at Sophia University. While attending university, Sawai was transferred to the Avex Trax record label and in March 2012, she performed the United States national anthem at the Tokyo Dome to begin the 2012 Major League Baseball season. A month later, Sawai was announced as one of the members of the girl group ARA, an acronym for Avex Rising Angels, and in November, they released the music video for their debut and only single "Make My Dreams Come True". The group disbanded in early 2013 after less than a year of promotions, but later that year in July, Avex announced that Sawai would be re-debuting as one of the lead vocalists for the girl group Faky under the Rhythm Zone record label. They debuted with the single "Better Without You" on July 29, 2013.

While being a member of Faky, Sawai participated in a number of solo projects. In October 2015, she appeared as the lead actress in Elliott Yamin's music video for his song "Katy". Sawai was a featured artist on Yamato's debut single "Shining", alongside fellow bandmate Akina, which was released on April 26, 2017. Later that year, Sawai had a voice role as Angélique Noir in the 2017 fashion simulation video game Style Savvy: Styling Star, and also performed the main theme song for the game, "Girls Be Ambitious". In 2018, she made a return to acting with a supporting role in the coming-of-age mystery series Colors, appearing in two episodes. In May 2018, she appeared as a dancer in a limited run stage production of The Book directed by Fuko Takenaka, as part of the Think Tank Bang dance art collective.

On November 16, 2018, Faky announced Sawai's departure from the group, citing her desire to focus on her acting career. She performed with the group for the last time on December 20, as part of their Four headline tour.

Breakthrough in Hollywood (2019–present) 
In 2019, Sawai portrayed Eiko, the daughter of a Yakuza boss, in the British crime thriller series Giri/Haji, appearing in six episodes. The series premièred on BBC Two in October to critical acclaim. That same year, Sawai was cast as martial arts warrior Elle in F9, the ninth film in the Fast & Furious franchise, directed by Justin Lin. Following her casting announcement, Sawai signed with WME. Filming for F9 took place between June and November 2019, and the film was released on May 20, 2021 to mixed reviews. F9 set several pandemic box office records with worldwide earnings of $726 million, and Sawai was particularly praised for "holding her own alongside franchise veterans."

Since 2022, Sawai has portrayed the main role of Naomi in the Apple TV+ adaptation of Pachinko, based on the novel of the same name by Min Jin Lee. Naomi is an original character created for the series. The show debuted on March 25, 2022 to critical acclaim; the following month it was renewed for a second season. The ensemble cast of the series won an Independent Spirit Award.

Upcoming projects 
In September 2021, Sawai was cast as the female lead, Lady Mariko, in the FX limited series Shōgun, a remake of the 1980 miniseries and based on the novel by James Clavell. The show is set to première in 2023. In June 2022, Sawai was cast as Cate, the lead role in Legendary's MonsterVerse television series Godzilla and the Titans, for Apple TV+. The show is intended to be a spin-off of the 2021 film, Godzilla vs. Kong.

Personal life
Sawai is bilingual in English and Japanese. She currently resides in Tokyo, Japan.

Filmography

Film

Television

Music videos

Video games

Stage credits

Discography

Awards and nominations

Notes

References

External links
 

Living people
1992 births
New Zealand film actresses
New Zealand television actresses
New Zealand stage actresses
New Zealand women pop singers
New Zealand female dancers
New Zealand emigrants to Japan
Japanese-language singers
New Zealand people of Japanese descent
21st-century New Zealand actresses
21st-century New Zealand women singers